Earl Chronister (November 2, 1924 - July 8, 2009) was the world record holder for the  shooting championship for over 20 years.

He was born on November 2, 1924, in Dallastown, Pennsylvania to Mabel (Markey) and Earl J. Chronister Sr.  Since 1952 he worked as an electrical contractor.  After suffering a heart attack in 1965, he took up long-distance shooting in an effort to hunt at long range.

Winning the state shooting championship in 1965 prompted Earl Chronister to get involved in researching long range shooting and testing bullets for the Sierra Bullet Company.
The world record was broken by his protegee Robert Frey of Airville in 1993.

References

External sources
Chronister's Passion Lead to His Record

American male sport shooters
1924 births
2009 deaths
People from York County, Pennsylvania